Gabriela Stoeva (born 15 July 1994) is a Bulgarian badminton player specializing in doubles. Her current partner is her younger sister, Stefani Stoeva. The pair is the three-time European Champion and European Games gold medalist as well. They competed at the 2016 and 2020 Summer Olympics.

Career 

Gabriela Stoeva started playing badminton at age 10 in the Haskovo School Club. She joined the national team in 2008, and made a debut in the international event in 2009. In 2009, she won a bronze medal at the European U-17 Championships in the girls' doubles event partnered with her sister, Stefani Stoeva. And at the 2013 European U-19 Championships, the sister won the gold medal.

Stoeva won her first BWF Grand Prix title at the 2014 Scottish Open in the women's doubles event with her sister. They beat Heather Olver and Lauren Smith of England in the finals round with the score 21-7 21-15. In 2015, she also won the Grand Prix tournament at the Russian and Dutch Open. Stoeva competed in the 2015 European Games, winning gold in women's doubles alongside her younger sister

In 2017, the Stoevas finished as the runner-ups at the Swiss Open Grand Prix Gold tournament, losing to the Chinese pair Chen Qingchen and Jia Yifan in the straight games. The sisters also won the silver medal at the European Championships.

In 2021, she won her second European Championships title.

Achievements

European Games 
Women's doubles

European Championships 
Women's doubles

European Junior Championships 
Girls' doubles

BWF World Tour (8 titles, 6 runners-up) 
The BWF World Tour, which was announced on 19 March 2017 and implemented in 2018, is a series of elite badminton tournaments sanctioned by the Badminton World Federation (BWF). The BWF World Tour is divided into levels of World Tour Finals, Super 1000, Super 750, Super 500, Super 300 (part of the HSBC World Tour), and the BWF Tour Super 100.

Women's doubles

BWF Grand Prix (3 titles, 3 runners-up) 
The BWF Grand Prix had two levels, the Grand Prix and Grand Prix Gold. It was a series of badminton tournaments sanctioned by the Badminton World Federation (BWF) and played between 2007 and 2017.

Women's doubles

  BWF Grand Prix Gold tournament
  BWF Grand Prix tournament

BWF International Challenge/Series (26 titles, 6 runners-up) 
Women's doubles

Mixed doubles

  BWF International Challenge tournament
  BWF International Series tournament
  BWF Future Series tournament

References

External links 
 
 

1994 births
Living people
People from Haskovo
Bulgarian female badminton players
Badminton players at the 2016 Summer Olympics
Badminton players at the 2020 Summer Olympics
Olympic badminton players of Bulgaria
Badminton players at the 2015 European Games
European Games gold medalists for Bulgaria
European Games medalists in badminton
Sportspeople from Haskovo Province